Sterlington is a town in northern Ouachita Parish, Louisiana, United States, near the boundary with Union Parish. At the 2010 census, the population was 1,594. In the 2018 census estimates, the population rose to 2,724. In 2014, Sterlington was the fastest-growing community in Northeast Louisiana.

History
Former Mayor Vern Breland was subsequently arrested for malfeasance in office in April 2020.

In 2022, the U.S. Securities and Exchange Commission charged the town of Sterlington, its former mayor, and the town's advise with misleading investors in the sale of $5.8 million in municipal bonds in 2017 and 2018.

Geography
According to the United States Census Bureau, the town has a total area of 2.3 square miles (6.0 km), of which 2.3 square miles (5.9 km) is land and 0.43% is water.

Demographics

2020 census

As of the 2020 United States census, there were 1,980 people, 926 households, and 726 families residing in the town.

2000 census

As of the census of 2000, there were 1,276 people, 478 households, and 356 families residing in the town. The racial makeup of the town was 84.17% White, 12.46% African American, 0.24% Asian, 1.72% from other races, and 1.41% from two or more races. Hispanic or Latino of any race were 4.08% of the population.

There were 478 households, out of which 38.5% had children under the age of 18 living with them, 51.9% were married couples living together, 19.2% had a female householder with no husband present, and 25.5% were non-families. 21.8% of all households were made up of individuals, and 9.4% had someone living alone who was 65 years of age or older. The average household size was 2.63 and the average family size was 3.07.

In the town, the population was spread out, with 29.7% under the age of 18, 11.1% from 18 to 24, 27.3% from 25 to 44, 18.7% from 45 to 64, and 13.2% who were 65 years of age or older. The median age was 33 years. For every 100 females, there were 87.1 males. For every 100 females age 18 and over, there were 82.3 males.

The median income for a household in the town was $33,750, and the median income for a family was $38,269. Males had a median income of $29,643 versus $21,250 for females. The per capita income for the town was $16,707. About 10.4% of families and 11.7% of the population were below the poverty line, including 14.8% of those under age 18 and 10.2% of those age 65 or over.

Economy
Since 1930, Sterlington has been home to ANGUS Chemical Company, a wholly owned subsidiary of the Dow Chemical Company, provides approximately 204 full-time and contract jobs to the area.  ANGUS has a $20 million annual impact on the local economy, as well as "Contributes more than $50,000 annually to the United Way and other community outreach programs."

Education
Sterlington is part of the Ouachita Parish School System and has one elementary school, A.L. Smith Elementary. Sterlington Middle School and High School are also under the supervision of the Ouachita system.

Notable people
Actor Ed Nelson relocated with his family to Sterlington from New Orleans in 2005 in the aftermath of Hurricane Katrina.

U.S. Ambassador Edward J. Perkins was born in Sterlington in 1928.

References

External links
 Town of Sterlington
 Sterlington Progress Community Progress Site for Sterlington, LA

Louisiana populated places on the Ouachita River
Towns in Louisiana
Towns in Ouachita Parish, Louisiana
Towns in Monroe, Louisiana metropolitan area